Panetta is an Italian surname. Notable people with the surname include:

 Daniel Panetta (born 1992), Canadian rock musician and producer 
 Daniela Panetta (born 1968), Italian jazz vocalist, composer, lyricist
 Francesco Panetta (born 1963), former Italian long-distance runner
 Jimmy Panetta (born 1969), California politician, son of Leon Panetta
 Leon Panetta (born 1938), former U. S. Secretary of Defense, former Director of Central Intelligence Agency, former U.S. Congressman, and former White House Chief of Staff
 Mike Panetta (born ~1971), the District of Columbia's shadow representative
 Niki Panetta (born 1986), Greek athlete

See also

Italian-language surnames